The 2017–18 Nemzeti Bajnokság I/B is the 50th season of the Nemzeti Bajnokság I/B, Hungary's second tier Handball league.

Team information 
There are 14–14 clubs in the 2 group, with three-three promoted teams from Nemzeti Bajnokság II.

Team changes

Promoted from 2016–17 Nemzeti Bajnokság II
KK Ajka
Tatabánya KC (U20)
Debreceni EAC

Relegated from 2016–17 Nemzeti Bajnokság I
Balmazújvárosi KK
Mezőkövesdi KC

Relegated to 2017–18 Nemzeti Bajnokság II
Alba-MÁV-Előre
Tiszavasvári SE
Pénzügyőr SE

Promoted to 2017–18 Nemzeti Bajnokság I
Dabas VSE KC
Ferencvárosi TC

Stadia and locations

Western Group
The following 14 clubs compete in the NB I/B (Western) during the 2017–18 season:

Eastern Group
The following 14 clubs compete in the NB I/B (Eastern) during the 2017–18 season:

League table

Western Group

Schedule and results
In the table below the home teams are listed on the left and the away teams along the top.

Eastern Group

Schedule and results
In the table below the home teams are listed on the left and the away teams along the top.

See also
 2017–18 Magyar Kupa
 2017–18 Nemzeti Bajnokság I
 2017–18 Nemzeti Bajnokság II

References

External links
 Hungarian Handball Federaration 
 hetmeteres.hu

Handball leagues in Hungary
Nemzeti Bajnoksag I/B Men